Cataglyphis  is a genus of ant, desert ants, in the subfamily Formicinae. Its most famous species is C. bicolor, the Sahara Desert ant, which runs on hot sand to find insects that died of heat exhaustion, and can, like other several other Cataglyphis species, sustain body temperatures  up to 50°C. Cataglyphis is also the name of an autonomous rover that won the NASA Sample Return Robot Centennial Challenge inspired by the navigation approaches used by desert ants.

Name
It was named in 1850, with reference to the impressions of its abdomen: "Von χατά und γλυψίς der Einschnitt. Eine Andeutung auf die vielen Einschnitte oder vielmehr Eindrücke de Hinterleibs."

Description
Species of this genus are behaviourally, morphologically, and physiologically adapted to dry and hot habitats.

Navigational behaviour
In the Sahara, ants live where  no bushes or clumps of grass are available to protect them, and where tracks are covered by wind-blown sand in seconds. The midday sun is so hot that even the permanent residents, sand lizards, insects, and a few birds, have to take shelter, but this is when, for not much more than an hour,  Cataglyphis spp. are to come out of their underground nests and forage. They can withstand higher temperatures than any other insects. They pour out on to the sand and search for insects that have died of heat stress. Each ant dashes about in zigzag patterns, but as soon as one is lucky enough to find a tiny insect corpse, it has to get it back to the nest fast before the ant dies of the heat. It does not retrace the zig-zagging path of its outward journey; even if a scent trail made this possible, such a route would be time-wasting. Instead, it runs in a straight line directly back to its nest hole.

On its outward journey, it zig-zags right and left. Every time it changes direction, it lifts its head and wheels around to take a bearing on the sun. In addition, it has to remember how far it went on each straight run. When  time to head for home, it has to sum all these data and come out with the precise direction needed. Some outward journeys take an ant a quarter of an hour, with sun sightings every few seconds.

In an experiment, individual ants were fitted with an apparatus that blocked direct sight of the sun, while giving a false impression of where the sun was, using a mirror. When these ants headed for home, they dashed off to a point in the desert displaced by just the amount that the mirror had shifted the sun's position.

Distribution
At least five different species of Cataglyphis occur in the Sahara Desert, which may be considered the center of distribution for this genus. Five species also occur in Israel. Some species reach into southern Russia, southern Spain, Greece, the former Yugoslavia, Hungary, the European part of Turkey, and the Aral-Caspian area near Tijanchan.

Parthenogenesis
Queen ants of the species C. cursor can produce female reproductive progeny (i.e. potential new queens or gynes) by parthenogenesis. Parthenogenesis, in this case, involves, a process (automictic thelytoky) by which two haploid products of meiosis fuse to form a diploid zygote that develops into a gyne.  Queens can also produce female worker ants by sexual reproduction involving fertilisation of eggs.

Species

Cataglyphis abyssinica (Forel, 1904)
Cataglyphis acutinodis Collingwood & Agosti, 1996
Cataglyphis adenensis (Forel, 1904)
Cataglyphis aenescens (Nylander, 1849)
Cataglyphis agostii Sharaf, 2007
Cataglyphis albicans (Roger, 1859)
Cataglyphis alibabae Pisarski, 1965
Cataglyphis altisquamis (André, 1881)
Cataglyphis arenaria Finzi, 1940
Cataglyphis argentata (Radoszkowsky, 1876)
Cataglyphis asiriensis Collingwood, 1985
Cataglyphis aurata Menozzi, 1932
Cataglyphis bellicosa (Karavaiev, 1924)
Cataglyphis bergiana Arnol'di, 1964
Cataglyphis bicolor (Fabricius, 1793) — Sahara Desert ant
Cataglyphis bicoloripes Walker, 1871
Cataglyphis bombycina (Roger, 1859) — Saharan silver ant
Cataglyphis bucharica Emery, 1925
Cataglyphis cana Santschi, 1925
Cataglyphis cinnamomea (Karavaiev, 1910)
Cataglyphis cugiai Menozzi, 1939
Cataglyphis cuneinodis Arnol'di, 1964
Cataglyphis cursor (Fonscolombe, 1846)
Cataglyphis diehlii (Forel, 1902)
Cataglyphis douwesi De Haro & Collingwood, 2000
Cataglyphis elegantissima Arnol'di, 1968
Cataglyphis emeryi (Karavaiev, 1911)
Cataglyphis emmae (Forel, 1909)
Cataglyphis espadaleri Cagniant, 2009
Cataglyphis flavitibia Chang & He, 2002
Cataglyphis flavobrunnea Collingwood & Agosti, 1996
Cataglyphis floricola Tinaut, 1993
Cataglyphis foreli (Ruzsky, 1903)
Cataglyphis fortis (Forel, 1902) — Sahara desert
Cataglyphis fossilis Cagniant, 2009
Cataglyphis frigida (André, 1881)
Cataglyphis gadeai De Haro & Collingwood, 2003
Cataglyphis gaetula Santschi, 1929
Cataglyphis glabilabia Chang & He, 2002
Cataglyphis gracilens Santschi, 1929
Cataglyphis hannae Agosti, 1994 — Tunisia
Cataglyphis harteni Collingwood & Agosti, 1996
Cataglyphis helanensis Chang & He, 2002
Cataglyphis holgerseni Collingwood & Agosti, 1996
Cataglyphis humeya Tinaut, 1991
Cataglyphis iberica (Emery, 1906)
Cataglyphis indica Pisarski, 1962
Cataglyphis isis (Forel, 1913)
Cataglyphis israelensis Ionescu & Eyer, 2016
Cataglyphis italica (Emery, 1906)
Cataglyphis karakalensis Arnol'di, 1964
Cataglyphis kurdistanica Pisarski, 1965
Cataglyphis laevior Santschi, 1929
Cataglyphis laylae Collingwood, 2011
Cataglyphis livida (André, 1881)
Cataglyphis longipedem (Eichwald, 1841)
Cataglyphis lunatica Baroni Urbani, 1969
Cataglyphis machmal Radchenko & Arakelian, 1991
Cataglyphis marroui Cagniant, 2009
Cataglyphis mauritanica (Emery, 1906)
Cataglyphis minima Collingwood, 1985
Cataglyphis nigra (André, 1881)
Cataglyphis nigripes Arnol'di, 1964
Cataglyphis nodus (Brullé, 1833) — Dalmatia
Cataglyphis oasium Menozzi, 1932
Cataglyphis opacior Collingwood & Agosti, 1996
Cataglyphis otini Santschi, 1929
Cataglyphis oxiana Arnol'di, 1964
Cataglyphis pallida Mayr, 1877
Cataglyphis piligera Arnol'di, 1964
Cataglyphis piliscapa (Forel, 1901)
Cataglyphis pilisquamis Santschi, 1929
Cataglyphis pubescens Radchenko & Paknia, 2010
Cataglyphis rosenhaueri Santschi, 1925
Cataglyphis rubra (Forel, 1903)
Cataglyphis sabulosa Kugler, 1981
Cataglyphis saharae Santschi, 1929
Cataglyphis savignyi (Dufour, 1862) — Sahara desert
Cataglyphis semitonsa Santschi, 1929
Cataglyphis setipes (Forel, 1894)
Cataglyphis shuaibensis Collingwood & Agosti, 1996
Cataglyphis stigmata Radchenko & Paknia, 2010
Cataglyphis tartessica Amor & Ortega, 2014
Cataglyphis takyrica Dlussky, Soyunov & Zabelin, 1990
Cataglyphis theryi Santschi, 1921
Cataglyphis urens Collingwood, 1985
Cataglyphis vaucheri (Emery, 1906)
Cataglyphis velox Santschi, 1929
Cataglyphis viatica (Fabricius, 1787)
Cataglyphis viaticoides (André, 1881)
Cataglyphis zakharovi Radchenko, 1997

References

Further reading
 Heusser, Daniel & Wehner, Rüdiger (2002): The visual centring response in desert ants, Cataglyphis fortis. The Journal of Experimental Biology 205: 585-590. Full HTML - PDF

External links

 YouTube: Video of Cataglyphis catching prey in the Sahara desert

Formicinae
Ant genera
Taxa named by Arnold Förster
Taxonomy articles created by Polbot